Dipaola may refer to:

27130 Dipaola, main-belt asteroid
James DiPaola (1953–2010), American police officer and politician